Solomon Heymann Auerbach (late 18th century – 1836) was a Hebrew scholar. He translated Habakkuk into German with explanatory notes (Breslau, 1821). He also collaborated in the translation of the Bible undertaken by Leopold Zunz, for which he furnished the translation of Ecclesiastes, on which book he wrote also a Hebrew commentary (Breslau, 1837).

Publications

References
 

18th-century births
1836 deaths
Bible commentators
Hebrew–German translators
Jewish translators of the Bible
Translators of the Bible into German
Writers from Poznań